Alexis Lagan (born January 25, 1993) is an American sport shooter who qualified for the 2020 Summer Olympics after winning the 2020 U.S. Olympic Team Trials.

References

Living people
1993 births
American female sport shooters
People from Boulder City, Nevada
Shooters at the 2020 Summer Olympics
21st-century American women
20th-century American women